Renaissance (Atco Records catalog no. [SD] 33-244; originally available in both mono and stereo) is the third album by rock band Vanilla Fudge, released in June 1968. It was their first album to feature mostly original material, with five of its seven tracks penned by band members.

In addition to the band's original songs, Renaissance also included "The Spell That Comes After" (written by Frank Zappa's and Herb Cohen's protege Essra Mohawk, but erroneously credited on original pressings of the LP to Zappa's art director Cal Schenkel), and a cover version of "Season of the Witch", originally written and performed by Scottish folk singer Donovan. The band also interpolates lyrics from a second Essra Mohawk song, "We Never Learn", into their rendition of "Season of the Witch".

CD reissues of Renaissance include three additional songs that were originally released as non-LP singles concurrently with the album.

Renaissance peaked at #20 on the Billboard album charts in July 1968. It also reached #8 in Finland.

The single, Season Of The Witch, PT. 1, reached #52 in Canada.

Track listing

Charts

Personnel
Carmine Appice - drums, backing vocals, lead vocal (track 6)
Tim Bogert - bass guitar, backing vocals, co-lead vocal (track 1) 
Vince Martell - electric guitar, backing vocals, co-lead vocal (track 2), lead vocal (track 7)
Mark Stein - keyboards, lead vocals (tracks 3, 4 & 5), co-lead vocals (tracks 1 & 2)

References 

Vanilla Fudge albums
1968 albums
Atco Records albums
Albums produced by Shadow Morton